Abdoulaye Diop (born October 15, 1990), known professionally as Majestic Drama, is a music producer and songwriter who lets his African origins influence his diverse sound and set himself apart from the crowd. At the age of fourteen, Drama moved from his home in Dakar, Senegal to Albany, New York where he ultimately graduated from high school and moved on to producing music.

As a producer, Drama has produced tracks for Wale, Kid Ink, Fetty Wap, Twista, and French recording artist La Fouine for his hit record, “Toute La Night”. His styles include hip hop, R&B, and pop.

CURE TOKEN

In 2021, Majestic Drama has partnered with charity crypto project called "Cure Token" to help fight Pediatric cancer. Backed by The Beckley Foundation, Cure Token has raised $200,000 for pediatric cancer, and is continuing to raise $10,000 daily.

Production Discography

2011
La Fouine - "La Fouine et Laouni (Réédition)"
"Toute La Night"

2013
The Lonely Island - The Wack Album
02. "Go Kindergarten" (feat. Robyn) 
16. "I Fucked My Aunt" (feat. T-Pain)

2014
Kid Ink - "BatGang: 4b's"
14."On Me"

2015
Twista - "Livin Legend EP"
5."Keep It On Me"

2016
Hayce Lemsi & Volts Face- "A des années lumières"
2."FAYADEM"

2017
Wale - Shine
8."MATHEMATICS"

2017
Hayce Lemsi -  Eureka
2."Havana" 

2020
LORRREY - "Think About It"

 1. "Think About It (feat. Majestic Drama)"

References

Hip hop record producers
People from Dakar